was a Japanese film actor. He appeared in more than 300 films between 1936 and 1975. He is most closely associated with the work of Kenji Mizoguchi, with whom he made twelve films.

Selected filmography

 Sisters of the Gion (1936)
 Aru yo no Tonosama (1946)
 Drunken Angel (1948)
 Battle of Roses (1950)
 Miss Oyu (1951)
 The Life of Oharu (1952)
 Life of a Woman (1953)
 A Geisha (1953)
 Sansho the Bailiff (1954)
 The Princess Sen (1954)
 The Crucified Lovers (1954)
 Bloody Spear at Mount Fuji (1955)
 Princess Yang Kwei-Fei (1955)
 Tōjūrō no Koi (1955)
 Street of Shame (1956)
 Akō Rōshi (1961)
 Kenji Mizoguchi: The Life of a Film Director (1975)

External links

1899 births
1977 deaths
Japanese male film actors
People from Fukuoka